Mr. and Mrs. Loving is a 1996 drama television film directed by Richard Friedenberg that aired on Showtime. It is based on a true story, but with fictionalized parts.

Plot summary

A racially mixed couple live in Virginia which violates the state's miscegenation laws. Arrested on the night of their wedding, Richard Loving and Mildred “Bean” Jeter are given the option to either be imprisoned or leave the state. The couple chooses to move to Washington, D.C. The Civil Rights Movement and the fight for their marriage led to their win of the Supreme Court case Loving v. Virginia.

Cast 

 Timothy Hutton as Richard Loving
 Lela Rochon as Mildred 'Bean' Jeter
 Ruby Dee as Sophia
 Bill Nunn as Leonard
 Corey Parker as Bernie Cohen
 Isaiah Washington as Blue
 Lawrence Dane as Sheriff

Reception
Lisa D. Horowitz, writing for Variety said, "Director-scripter Richard Friedenberg has fashioned a straightforward tale that doesn’t pull any punches. He’s a better writer than helmer, crafting some fine dialogue. But he’s blessed with an excellent cast, led by the reliably understated Hutton". Scott D. Pierce of Deseret News wrote, "Showtime doesn't make a lot of movies worth watching, but Mr. and Mrs. Loving is an exception."

Accolades

Accuracy
According to Mildred Loving, "not much of it was very true. The only part of it right was I had three children."

References

External links
 

1996 television films
1996 drama films
1996 films
American television films
Films directed by Richard Friedenberg
Mildred and Richard Loving